Knuckledust is a 2020 British action-thriller film written and directed by James Kermack. Filmed in the United Kingdom, the film stars Moe Dunford, Kate Dickie, Camille Rowe, Phil Davis, Alex Ferns, Olivier Richters, Jaime Winstone, Gethin Anthony, and Sébastien Foucan. It was released in the United States and Canada on VOD by Samuel Goldwyn Films on December 8, 2020, and in the United Kingdom on December 11, where it was met with mixed reviews from critics.

Premise
In Knuckledust, police discover an elite fight club where they find seven underground levels, filled with the dead bodies of fighters from around the world. Only one man is found left alive. The task force has to work out if he is a mass murderer or the lone survivor.

Cast
 Moe Dunford as Hard Eight
 Kate Dickie as Keaton
 Camille Rowe as Serena
 Phil Davis as Happy
 Alex Ferns as Major Vaughn
 Olivier Richters as Rawbone
 Jaime Winstone as Redmond
 Gethin Anthony as Jeremiah
 Sébastien Foucan as Tick Tock

Production
Principal photography for Knuckledust began on October 28, 2019. After filming in multiple countries in Europe, filming concluded on December 3, 2019, in the United Kingdom. On November 2, 2020, Samuel Goldwyn Films announced that they would distribute the film. In an interview, actress Kate Dickie revealed that she joined the film after reading its script.

Reception
From The Guardian, Leslie Felperin gave the film a star rating of two stars out of five, writing that the film's "cinematography seems designed to distract from the shabbiness of the sets, while the muffled dialogue and too-loud backing tracks make it nigh on impossible to work out what the hell is going on".

References

External links
 
 

2020 films
British action thriller films
2020s English-language films
2020s British films